An oidium (plural: oidia) is an asexually produced fungal spore that (in contrast to conidia) is presumed not to constitute the main reproductive preoccupation of the fungus at that time.
The hypha breaks up into component cells/ small pieces and develop into spores. Oidia cannot survive in unfavourable conditions.

References

Illinois Mycological Association glossary 

Fungal morphology and anatomy

pt:Oídio